Robert Russell (born 11 February 1957) is a Scottish former professional footballer, who is best known for his time with Rangers.

Club career
Born in Glasgow, Russell joined Rangers from Shettleston Juniors in 1977 and made his first team debut against Aberdeen on 13 August that year, aged only 20. The game ended in a 3–1 defeat, however Rangers went on to win the treble that season and Russell cemented his place on the right side of the midfield.

He made 370 appearances for the club and won a league championship, two Scottish Cups and four Scottish League Cups. He left Rangers and joined Motherwell in 1987 and was part of the side that won the 1990–91 Scottish Cup.

Coaching career
Russell returned to Rangers as part of the youth coaching set up. Bobby Russell helps out in Aurora, Ontario with the Aurora Stingers with special clinics.

Russell resides in Aurora Ontario, where he coaches finishing school, for young footballers.

References

External links

Hall of Fame – Bobby Russell Rangers FC

1957 births
Living people
Scottish footballers
Association football midfielders
Scotland under-21 international footballers
Scottish Football League players
Scottish Junior Football Association players
Rangers F.C. players
Motherwell F.C. players
Ayr United F.C. players
Arbroath F.C. players
Cowdenbeath F.C. players
Cumbernauld United F.C. players
Albion Rovers F.C. players
Glasgow United F.C. players